Shannon ("old river") is an Irish name, Anglicised from Sionainn. Alternative spellings include Shannen, Shanon, Shannan, Seanan, and Siannon. The variant Shanna is an Anglicisation of Sionna.

Sionainn derives from the Irish name Abha na tSionainn for the River Shannon. Because the suffix ain indicates a diminutive in Irish, the name is sometimes mistranslated as 'little wise one', but means 'possessor of wisdom'.

Some derive the denomination of Shannon (Irish: Sionnain) from the phrase sean-amhan or "old river." Another reported derivation is from Ó Seanaigh, "descendant of Seanach," which yielded the surnames Shanahan and Shannon.

Namesake
The name Sionainn alludes to Sionna, a goddess in Irish mythology whose name means 'possessor of wisdom'. She is the namesake and matron of Sionainn, the River Shannon. The Shannon is the longest river in the British Isles.

Sionainn is one of seven rivers of knowledge said to flow from Connla's Well, the well of wisdom in the Celtic Otherworld (the realm of the dead). Legends vary about the creation of the river, but they all recount the drowning of the Sionna, granddaughter of the great sea god Lir, usually at an undersea well. 

According to the legend, nine sacred hazel (or, by some accounts, rowan) trees grow near the well, and drop their bright red fruit in it and on the ground. In the well live the Salmon of Knowledge, whose wisdom comes from eating this fruit. By eating the fruit or one of the salmon, one can share in this wisdom.

Shortened forms
Shana and Shanna are familiar diminutives or forms of Shannon or Sionna.

Popularity
In the United States, the name first appeared on the Social Security Administration's in 1881 for males. It later gained popularity as a feminine name in 1937. During the 1970s, American parents began to confer the name on boys and girls alike. It was during this time that the name's popularity peaked in the United States. In the 1990 United States Census, Shannon was the 317th most common name for American males.

Irish emigrants may have popularized the name due to their nostalgia for Ireland. After Shannon became a popular unisex name in the United States, Irish parents, too, began to give newborn boys this name.

Women
 Shannon Applegate, American historian
 Shannon Ashlyn (born 1990), Australian Actress
 Shannon Bahrke (born 1980), American freestyle skier
 Shannon Baker (born 1980), New Zealand Rugby player
 Shannon Barnett (born 1982), American composer
 Shannon Bell (born 1955), Canadian performance philosopher
 Shannon Berry, American actress
 Shannon Beveridge (born 1992), American YouTuber
 Shannon Bex (born 1980), American singer
 Shannon Birchard (born 1994), Canadian curler
 Shannon Bilbray-Axelrod (born 1973), American politician
 Shannon Bobbitt (born 1985), American basketball player
 Shannon Bolin (1917–2016), American actress and singer
 Shannon Boxx (born 1977), American soccer player
 Shannon Bramer (born 1973), Canadian poet
 Shannon Bream (born 1970), American journalist
 Shannon Brown (musician) (born 1973), American singer
 Shannon Campbell (born 1996), Australian footballer
 Shannon Cassidy (1961–1999), American voice actress
 Shannon Chan-Kent (born 1988), Canadian voice actress
 Shannon Click (born 1983), American model
 Shannon Cochran (born 1958), American actress
 Shannon Conley, American actress
 Shannon Crawford (born 1963), Canadian rower
 Shannon Cunneen (born 1977), Australian cricketer
 Shannon Curfman (born 1985), American singer
 Shannon Curtis, American dreampop singer
 Shannon Dawdy (born 1967), American historian
 Shannon Day (1896–1977), American silent-film actress
 Shannon Delany, American author
 Shannen Doherty, American actress
 Shannon Elizabeth (born 1973), American actress
 Shannon Flynn (born 1996), English actress
 Shannon Flynn, American director
 Shannon Brenda Greene (born 1958), stage name Shannon, American singer 
 Shannon Grove (born 1965), American politician from California
 Shannon Jackson, American performance theorist, author of the 2004 book Professing Performativity
 Shannon Lucid (born 1943) American biochemist and astronaut
 Shannon Lynn (born 1985), Scottish footballer
 Shannon Magrane (born 1995), performer on American Idol
 Shannon McRandle (born 1969), model and makeup artist
 Shannon Ashley Mitchell (born 1987), Canadian actress, model, entrepreneur and author
 Shannon Spruill (born 1975), American professional wrestler, manager, and actor better known as Daffney
 Shannon C. Stimson (born 1951), American political theorist
 Shannon Tweed, (born 1957), Canadian actress
 Shannon Walker (born 1965), American physicist and astronaut
 Shannon Arrum Williams (born 1998), Korean pop singer
 Shannon Webb (born 1999), American theatre manager
 Shannon Whirry, American actor

Men
 Shannon Bennett (born 1975), Australian chef and author
 Shannon Birchall, Australian born musician
 Shannon Boatman (born 1984),  Canadian football player
 Shannon Breen (born 1989), American football player
 Shannon Boyd, (born 1992), Australian football player
 Shannon Boyd-Bailey McCune (1913–1993), American geographer
 Shannon Briggs (born 1971),  American professional boxer
 Shannon Brown (born 1985), American Basketball player
 Shannon Breen (born 1989), American football player
 Shannon Clavelle (born 1973), American football player
 Shannon Cole (born 1984), Australian NJ football player
 Shannon Corcoran (born 1971), American football player
 Shannon Culver (born 1971), Canadian football player
 Shannon Dallas (born 1977), Australian skier
 Shannon Denton, American storyteller
 Richard Shannon Hoon, rock musician from Indiana
 Shannon Leto (born 1970), American drummer
 Shannon Mitchell (born 1972), American football player
 Shannon Noll (born 1975), Australian singer
 Shannon Sharpe (born 1968), American football player
 Shannon Charles Thomas (1971–2005), American murderer
 Shannon Wheeler, American cartoonist
 Shannon Zimmerman (born 1972), American politician

See also
 Shannon-Ogbnai Abeda (born 1996), Eritrean-Canadian alpine skier
 List of Irish-language given names
 Shannon (surname)

References

English unisex given names
English-language unisex given names
Irish unisex given names
Irish-language unisex given names